Mark Arnold (born December 15, 1966, in San Jose, California) is an American writer and commentator who grew up in Saratoga, California. He has contributed to several publications in the United States, including The Comics Journal, Hogan's Alley, Back Issue!, and Comics Buyer's Guide. Arnold also worked with Jerry Beck and Leslie Cabarga on their Harvey Comics Classics series for Dark Horse Comics.

Arnold has a BA degree in Broadcast Communication Arts from San Francisco State University, and has studied art through Art Instruction Schools. He currently resides in Springfield, Oregon.

Books
Arnold has written numerous books about comic books, animation and music. The first, The Best of The Harveyville Fun Times!, focused on the comic book publisher Harvey Comics. The second was Created and Produced by Total TeleVision productions: The Story of Underdog, Tennessee Tuxedo and the Rest. If You're Cracked, You're Happy: The History of Cracked Mazagine, a two-volume set followed in 2011. Next, Arnold wrote Mark Arnold Picks On The Beatles and Frozen in Ice: The Story of Walt Disney Productions 1966-1985. He has continued to write additional books about DePatie-Freleng, The Monkees and the Chipmunks.

Art shows
Arnold also compiled the traveling original art show entitled "From Richie Rich to Wendy the Witch: The Art of Harvey Comics" which debuted in June 2008 at San Francisco's Cartoon Art Museum, moving to New York City's Museum of Comic and Cartoon Art in December 2008 and traveling again to Pittsburgh, Pennsylvania, in May 2009. The show ended at Van Eaton Galleries in Sherman Oaks, California in May 2010.

Arnold compiled another original art show entitled "70 Years of Archie Comics" which debuted in July 2011 again at San Francisco's Cartoon Art Museum and ran through December 2011.

In 2012, a third art show entitled "What Me, Worry? 60 Years of Mad" debuted on April 20 at the museum.

Arnold also contributed to "Aliens, Monsters, and Madmen: The Art of EC Comics", an art show presented at the University of Oregon's Jordan Schnitzer Museum of Art from May 14 to July 16, 2016. Besides his exhibit contributions, Arnold gave a talk on Harvey Kurtzman and Mad magazine at the museum on June 29, 2016.

Contributions to DVD releases
Arnold recorded audio commentaries and video narration for the following DVD releases through Shout! Factory: "Casper the Friendly Ghost: The Complete Collection (1945-1963)", "Underdog: The Complete Series" and "Tennessee Tuxedo And His Tales: Complete Collection" released in 2011 and 2012.

From 2016 to 2020, Arnold contributed commentaries and onscreen documentary appearances for Kino Lorber's DePatie-Freleng Animated Film Collection including The Inspector, Roland and Rattfink, The Ant and the Aardvark, The Tijuana Toads, The Blue Racer, Hoot Kloot, The Dogfather, Misterjaw, Crazylegs Crane, and six volumes of The Pink Panther. The cartoons were issued on DVD and Blu-ray.

The Geek Speak Show and Fun Ideas Podcast
Arnold debuted his segment called "The Stories Behind the Stories" on "The Geek Speak Show", on September 5, 2012. The segment features interviews with past, present and up-and-coming people in the comic book and animation industry. Multiple episodes of "The Stories Behind the Stories" have been made available via a YouTube channel.

After 19 episodes, Arnold went on to create and host his own podcast called "Fun Ideas Podcast", which premiered on September 12, 2018. Arnold features guests from the comic book, animation, TV, movie and music industries. There have been over 200 episodes as of 2023.

Famous Saratogans display
The Saratoga History Museum honored Arnold by including him in a display of famous Saratogans, which ran from November 2009 through January 2010.

Bibliography

As contributor

References

External links
 
 Fun Ideas Productions A blog by Mark Arnold
 Web site for The Harveyville Fun Times!

American male writers
Historians of animation
Living people
1966 births
People from Saratoga, California
San Francisco State University alumni